is a Japanese drummer.  He played on Kazuki Tomokawa's albums and is part of the band Vajra (with Kan Mikami and Keiji Haino).  His last album, released in 2006 on P.S.F. Records, is entitled Drum Drama.

References 

1950 births
Japanese drummers
Japanese male musicians
Living people
Musicians from Tokyo
P.S.F. Records artists